Thomas Scott (1907 - date of death unknown) was an English diver.

Boxing
He competed in the 10 metre platform at the 1930 British Empire Games for England.

Personal life
He was a police officer at the time of the 1930 Games.

References

1907 births
Year of death missing
English male divers
Commonwealth Games medallists in diving
Commonwealth Games bronze medallists for England
Divers at the 1930 British Empire Games
Medallists at the 1930 British Empire Games